Ji Yansong (born November 29, 1989) is a Chinese male curler and curling coach.

At the international level, he is a 2015 World Mixed bronze medallist and a three-time Pacific junior champion curler (2008, 2009, 2010).

Teams

Men's

Mixed

Mixed doubles

Record as a coach of national teams

References

External links

Living people
1989 births
Sportspeople from Harbin
Chinese male curlers
Chinese curling coaches
Place of birth missing (living people)